François-Joseph Sollacaro (born 21 March 1994) is a French professional footballer who plays as a goalkeeper for  club Ajaccio.

References

External links 
 

1994 births
Living people
French footballers
Association football goalkeepers
Sportspeople from Ajaccio
Footballers from Corsica
AC Ajaccio players
Ligue 1 players
Ligue 2 players
Championnat National 3 players